The frigate Shtandart is a modern replica of the first ship of Russia's Baltic fleet, was launched in 1703 at the Olonetsky shipyard near Olonets by the decree of Tsar Peter I and orders issued by commander Aleksandr Menshikov. The name Shtandart was also given to the royal yachts of the tsars until the Russian Revolution in 1917. Tsar Nicholas II's royal yacht was last of this series.

Background 

On January 22, 1702, at the height of the Third Northern War, Peter the Great ordered the construction of the Shtandart (Russian: Штандартъ) . The ship, a 28-gun frigate, was the first part of Russia's later Baltic Fleet. She was responsible for repelling the Swedish naval attack on Saint Petersburg in 1705.

The original was designed by Peter the Great himself, after his trip to Netherlands and England. Completed in August 1703 by the Dutch master Vibe Gerense and then, with Peter as captain, sailed to St. Petersburg to be baptized. The ship was named Shtandart, after a new Royal standard showing all four seas to which Russia now had access.

It served in the Third Northern War and was the flagship of the Russian Navy for 16 years. After it was retired in 1719, it remained in the Kronverk Canal behind the Peter and Paul Fortress in Saint Petersburg. In 1728 it was so dilapidated that the hull broke into pieces during lifting. Tsarina Catharina the First gave orders to build a replica, but they were not carried out at the time.

History 
Saint Petersburg would celebrate its 300th anniversary in 2003. In 1988 the management of the Hermitage Museum commissioned maritime researcher Viktor Krainukov to construct an exposition model of the first ship built at that time, namely the flagship of Peter the Great: the Shtandart.

1992 

There was very little data, but after extensive research, he made a set of construction drawings and the model. When Vladimir Martous, driving force behind the Maritime Training Center, first saw that model of the imperial warship in the city's Menshikov Palace in 1992, he promised to let her sail again."On the moment I saw it, I fell in love," he said."

 1993 

 Construction planning 

In November 1994, 275 years after it sailed for the last time, the actual reconstruction of the Shtandart was finally able to start.

Martous drew up plans for recreating the Shtandart. Construction drawings were made with the help of researchers such as Greg Palmer, ship historian and Viktor Krainukov, expert on Russian shipbuilding history.

 1994 

He worked on the Batavia Dock in Lelystad under the direction of Willem Vos and used his own experience in the construction of an earlier ship, the St. Peter, which he built especially to visit the "Fêtes maritimes de Douarnenez " of 1992, and that he had sold to finance the construction of the Shtandart. Later this ship starred in the film series Pirates of the Caribbean.

 Construction 
The team used the same materials and methods as the original flagship.

 Keel and frames 

The keel was laid on November 4, 1994. The oak for the beams was taken from the forests of Saint Petersburg and the Leningrad oblast .

 1995 

On April 8, 1995, the first of 44 beams was erected, with more soon to follow....

 1996 

 Skin 

In that autumn and winter of 1996, larch trees were again removed from the forest over 15 meters in length, to cut skin and decking boards 8 cm thick and 20 cm wide.

 1997 

A 12-metre-long, 18th-century steam box was rebuilt to allow for the bending and shaping of the skin and decking planks. According to Martous, they have even recreated the fuel used to fuel the steam box - the sawdust and wood shavings left over from their carpentry.

and also skin planks:

but soon also for the two upper decks, made of pine, fore and aft

 1998 

But because it was necessary to baptize, a temporary stern was made (with the name misspelled, as turned out later!), and also other large pieces: the figurehead and the guardian dwarf "Grumpy"

 Baptism 

The replica Shtandart was christened on May 30, 1998, by the ship's two patrons, Prince Andrew, the Duke of York and the Governor of Saint Petersburg, Vladimir Ykovlev.

Also the following winter many accessories and parts were manufactured, the rudder the figurehead were painted, and of course the final transom, with all decorations, and some 'spars' of pine, such as ra's, foresail, bowsprit, mizzen and large mast (all masts consist of 3 parts).

 1999 

The sawing, steaming, bending and placement of the skin planks had continued all along until the last one was placed on March 20, 1999. The whole summer there was caulking and painting.

 Carving 

 Rigging 

 Launching 
The rebirth of the first ship of the Russian Baltic Fleet attracted forty thousand Saint Petersburgers on September 4, 1999 
to the banks of the Neva. The Frigate measuring 30 by 7 meters, with 28 guns, two masts and bowsprit with figurehead, was launched into the Neva by a gigantic floating crane, near the Smolny Institute, the same place where its illustrious predecessor was baptized in 1703.

And so it happened: on Saturday, September 4, 1999, the Shtandart hoisted the cross, along with the flags of the Imperial Family, the city of Saint Petersburg and the Russian Federation.

 Finishing afloat 
The ship was now afloat, but there was still more than a year to work on installing and commissioning all the technology, engines, tanks, etc.

 2000 

 Start 'Maiden Trip' 
The original Shtandart had a crew of 150 in wartime. For the replica, the permanent crew is 12 people, volunteers who want to learn the "trade" supplement the crew.

 2010s 
In the more than 20 years of the "new" Shtandart's existence, the voyages cover all of western Europe, from beyond the North Cape to Kirkenes in 2009, to the Canary Islands (winter 2013-14) and from Cyprus (Nov 2021) to Belfast (2017).
She has visited one hundred and seventy five ports in nineteen countries. Around 9000 trainees has been on board Shtandart for sailing adventure and training.

As cooperating, young students, more than 9000 young people have gained a sailing and team building experience, which is unmatched on shore. Some of them sail (and work!)

The total overhaul was done in a small Portuguese port Vila do Conde in the winter of 2016-2017

 2020s 
As a result of sanctions against Russia following the 2022 Russian invasion of Ukraine, Russian ships are denied entry to European ports. However, after an application submitted by Président des Amis des Grands Voiliers association to French Secretary of the State, the Shtandart had received permission to attend French and Spanish ports.

Update: Left Port-de-Bouc on May 6 for San Sebastian. (see Marinetraffic.com) Arrived in Pasai San Pedro at May 26  Update: Left on June 6th San Sebastian, after a stay of 10 days, for La Rochelle. Cut AIS on June 6, in infraction with French law 

 Milestones of the Shtandart 
 On September 4, 1999, the Shtandart was launched at the Petrovsky Shipyard in St Petersburg.
 On 25 June 2000 the Shtandart set sail on her maiden voyage, where frigate visited the same harbours and places as Peter I, during his Grand Embassy.
 In 2005–2009, the Shtandart has played the part of the "dream ship" at the Scarlet Sails festival, an annual celebration of the end of the school year in St. Petersburg from a novel by Alexander Grinanother "Scarlet Sails" link (Russian).
 In 2010-2020, the Shtandart has sailed in different European ports as a school-ship. Main mission was to develop a friendship and mutual understanding between people of all nations.
 In 2020-2022, despite of health limitations in Europe, the Shtandart has continued her sail-training activity.

 Classification of the ship 
From 2007, sailing vessels in Russia faced challenges with a classification.  The new National Sea and River Authority (then Росморречнадзор/Rosmorrechnadzor, now Госморречнадзор/Gosmorrechnadzor) refused to issue classification certificates for sailing ships. The Shtandart was one of the most prominent of these vessels, so her dispute with this government agency was widely publicized.
In 2020, after publishing new rules for Sport sailing vessels, the Russian Maritime register of shipping has classified the Shtandart as "sail-training vessel, traditional built" for voyages in the area 2 (200 miles from nearest port).

 Shtandart activities in 2000–2020 
 June 25, 2000 - the Shtandart has left St Petersburg port for her maiden voyage
 Season 2000 route: St Petersburg — Vysby — Zaandam — Ijmuiden — Dunkirk — Roskoff — Brest for Brest 2000 — London — Amsterdam — Bremerhaven Sail Bremerhaven — St Malo
 season 2005 route: St Petersburg — Copenhagen — Odense — Halmstad — Helsinki — St Petersburg — Baltiisk— Lelystad — Rochester — London — Lowestoft — Hartlepool — Newcastle — Frederikstad (TSR) — Bremerhaven — Helgoland — Wismar — Travemünde — Frederikshavn — Gøteborg — Szczecin — Kotka — St Petersburg
 On August 25, 2009, the Shtandart sailed from St Petersburg all way around Norway's North Cape.
 During the winter of 2009–2010, the ship remained in Oslo, Norway, for winter quarters.
 season 2010 route: Norway — Poland — Germany — Finland — Belgium (TSR ports) — Denmark — Norway — Germany — Netherlands
 season 2015 route: Hamburg — Flensburg — Stockholm — Riga — Klaipeda — Szczecin — Sandefjord — Aalesund — Kristiansand — Aalborg — Amsterdam (Sail Amsterdam 2015) — Vlissingen — Poole — Lisbon — Malaga — Cannes — Rome — Genoa — Napoli — Palermo
 season 2016 route: Barcelona — Malaga — Gibraltar — Cascais — Ferrol — Barcelona — Sete — Tarragona — Rochefort — Brest — Swanage — Edinbough — Blyth — Goteborg  — Sønderborg — Amsterdam — Plymouth — St Malo — Bordeaux — Porto
 season 2017 route: Vila do Conde — Cadis — Malaga — Vigo — Vannes — Dublin — Belfast — Liverpool — Honfleur — Kotka — Turku — Klaipeda — Szczecin — Copenhagen — La Rochelle — Nantes — Honfleur — Amsterdam — Copenhagen — St Malo — La Coruña — Porto — Malaga — Palma de Mallorca — Barcelona
 season 2018 route: Cartagena — Tarragona — Florence — Genoa — Grande-Motte — Tarragona — Sete — Castellon de la Plana — Alicante — Cadiz — Vigo — Saint-Malo — Oostende — Caen — Amsterdam — Szczecin — Aalborg — Copenhagen — Amsterdam — Sunderland — Esbjerg — Stavanger — Aarhus — Copenhagen — Amsterdam — Honfleur — La Rochelle 
 season 2019 route: La Rochelle — Santander — La Coruna — Cascais — Malaga — Seville — Vigo — Vannes — Rouen — Scheveningen — Aalborg — Frederikstad — Bergen — Aarhus — Stockholm — Boulogne — Southampton — Dunkirk — Amsterdam — La Rochelle — Lisbon — Malaga — Valencia — Barcelona
 season 2020 route: Barcelona — Naples — Corfu — Valetta — Castellion — Vigo — La Rochelle — Calais — Zaandam
 season 2021 route: La Rochelle - Pasaia - La Rochelle - Saint Malo - Calais - Zaandam - Harlingen - Hamburg - Swinoustje - Riga - Tallinn - Klaipeda - Szczecin - Scheveningen - Oostende - Caen - La Rochelle - Vigo - Cascais - Malaga - Ibiza - Valetta - Athens - Paros - Chios - Lemnos - Rafena - Santorini - Athens - Rhodos - Kos - Rhodos - Limassol - Rhodos - Kos

 Shtandart in films 
 2007 : The Sovereign's Servant, a Russian war film written and directed by Oleg Ryaskov.
 2011 : The secret service agent's memories, a Russian historical film and TV series based on the novel by Oleg Ryaskov, who is also the director.
 2011 : Nova Zembla, a Dutch historical drama film directed by Reinout Oerlemans.
 2015 : Michiel de Ruyter, a 2015 Dutch film about the 17th-century admiral Michiel de Ruyter directed by Roel Reiné. On the English promotional website, the film has the title Admiral.
 2015 : Peter and Wendy, a 2015 adaptation of JM Barrie’s Peter Pan, where the frigate Shtandart stood in for Captain Hook’s ship, the Sea Devil''.

References

External links 

   Official Shtandart website (Russian)
 Official Shtandart Instagramm page 
List of Russian sail frigates

Replica ships
1999 ships
Frigates of Russia
Training ships
Sail training
Sail training ships
Training ships of the Russian Navy
Tall ships
Individual sailing vessels
Tall ships of Russia
Lists of sailing ships
Tall ships competitions
Full-rigged ships